David Andrew Lloyd OBE (born 24 December 1940) is a former British diplomat.

He was educated at Lancing College and Clare College, Cambridge. He was appointed as British Ambassador to Slovenia in 1997 before retiring from the Diplomatic Service in 2000.

References
LLOYD, David Andrew, Who's Who 2013, A & C Black, 2013; online edn, Oxford University Press, Dec 2012, accessed 5 Jan 2013

1940 births
Living people
People educated at Lancing College
Alumni of Clare College, Cambridge
Officers of the Order of the British Empire
Ambassadors of the United Kingdom to Slovenia